The Circular Letter was an early Interlingua newsletter published from 1954 to 1965, when it was expanded and renamed Lingua e Vita. D. M. Hallowes, who became the Secretary of the British Interlingua Society (BIS), edited the publication. Issue 9, dated March 1956, printed a suggestion that a British Interlingua organization be formed:

"Mr. (N.) Divall has suggested the time has now come when the friends of Interlingua in the British Isles are numerous enough that they should form a society similar to those possessed by the movements for Interlingue (Occidental) and Ido...This announcement can be regarded as sufficient to create it."

In June of that year, the BIS was officially founded. The 14th issue, released in November 1957, announced that twice the number of copies would need to be printed to inform a much larger circle of readers. The 15th issue announced the release of the first English-Interlingua Dictionary, written by Woodruff W. Bryne.

During Bryne's last year as secretary, 1959, the Circular Letter was not printed for reasons that are not immediately clear. When Brian C. Sexton became secretary of the society in 1960, he immediately resumed publication. The Circular Letter was published two or three times a year until the summer of 1965, when the first issue of Lingua e Vita appeared.

Generally, the letter that is used to circulate any special message to a huge member of audiences at the same time is known as circular letter. It is one of the cost effective means of circulating information or introducing new products to mass people. However, circular letters are not only used in business, but also in social, political and personal affairs.

Notes

External links
 Gopsill, F. P. 100 Editiones Britannic. Historia de Interlingua: Communication Sin Frontieras, 2001, revised 2006.

1954 establishments in the United Kingdom
1965 disestablishments in the United Kingdom
Interlingua publications
Magazines established in 1954
Magazines disestablished in 1965
Newsletters
Triannual magazines published in the United Kingdom